Abraham of Bulgaria (died April 1, 1229) was a Christian convert from Islam later made a martyr and saint of the Russian Orthodox Church.

He was born in Volga Bulgaria, amongst the Muslim Volga Bulgars in what is now Tatarstan, Russia. He grew to become an Islamic merchant, and was good and kindly towards the destitute. He later converted to Christianity. Muslims persistently persuaded him to renounce Christ, but Abraham was unshakable in his faith and was truncated by the sword (quarted) for his conversion by his compatriots on 1 April  1229 at the Volga bank. The saint was buried by Russian merchants in the Christian cemetery in Bulgar (the capital of Volga Bulgaria). Grand prince of Vladimir Georgy Vsevolodovich ordered the transfer of the body of Abraham to Vladimir.

Soon, according to the chronicle testimony, the city of Bulgar (Bolgar) was burnt as a punishment "for the blood of the martyr of Christ". On the spot of execution of Abraham of Bulgaria a healing spring appeared. A local legend says that the first person to be healed by this source was a Muslim man.

His relics are venerated at Vladimir on the Klyazma. Laurentian Chronicle contains the registry about this event that took place on 9 March 1230. 

His feast day is celebrated on March 9, the translation of relics, and is also commemorated on April 1.

Origin, occupation 
There is very little information about the life of Abraham of Bulgaria.

Basic information about him is contained in the chronicles and written histories of the XVII century. The oldest source reporting about Abraham of Bulgaria is the Laurentian Codex (XIV century).

The Chronicler said that Abraham of Bulgaria was "of another language, not Russian" (the name before baptism is unknown). Probably, he came from the Bulgarians ("Volga Bulgarians", "Kama Bulgarians"), was growing up in the Muslim environment and originally professed Islam.

Abraham of Bulgaria was a rich and notable merchant; he traded in the cities of the Volga region.

References

External sources
Holweck, F. G. A Biographical Dictionary of the Saints. St. Louis, MO: B. Herder Book Co. 1924.

External links

Year of birth missing
1229 deaths
13th-century Christian saints
13th-century Eastern Orthodox martyrs
Converts to Eastern Orthodoxy from Islam
Miracle workers
People executed for apostasy from Islam